The Palatka Golf Club is a public-use golf course established in 1925. Designed by Donald Ross, the course borders the Ravine Gardens State Park and is 5942 yards long. The golf club is located at 1715 Moseley Avenue Palatka, Florida.

External links
 Official website

Golf clubs and courses designed by Donald Ross
Golf clubs and courses in Florida
Tourist attractions in Palatka, Florida
Tourist attractions in Putnam County, Florida

da:Golfbane
de:Golfplatz
eo:Golfejo
fr:Terrain de golf
ga:Machaire gailf
ko:골프장
hr:Igralište za golf
is:Golfvöllur
it:Campo da golf
nl:Golfbaan
ja:ゴルフ場
no:Golfbane
pl:Pole golfowe
pt:Campo de golfe
simple:Golf course
sv:Golfbana
zh:高爾夫球場